Paul Terry may refer to:

Paul Terry (cartoonist) (1887–1971), American, founder of Terrytoons
Paul Terry (footballer) (born 1979), English 
Paul Terry (cricketer) (born 1959), English  
Paul Terry (actor) (born 1985), English